Alternaria brassicae is a plant pathogen able to infect most Brassica species including important crops such as broccoli, cabbage and oil seed rape. It causes damping off if infection occurs in younger plants and less severe leaf spot symptoms on infections of older plants.

References

External links
 Index Fungorum
 USDA ARS Fungal Database
 Alternaria brassicae host list : Pathogens of Plants of Hawaii

brassicae
Fungal plant pathogens and diseases
Eudicot diseases
Fungi described in 1880